Find Me a Drink Home is the first studio album by rock group Cheap Girls. It was released on April 22, 2008, on Bermuda Mohawk Records. Los Diaper Records released it on vinyl in May 2008 and Quote Unquote Records released it digitally on July 11, 2008. The album was produced by Rick Johnson and Cheap Girls. Johnson also engineered, mixed and played keys on the album. In the album notes bass player and lyricist Ian Graham is credited with the writing of the lyrics.

Recording
The album notes state that it was recorded in a Custer, Michigan cabin in January and February 2008. It was mastered by Derron Nuhfer at Sarlacc Mastering in Gainesville, Florida.

Release
The album was released on April 22, 2008, on Bermuda Mohawk Records. On August 2, 2012, it was announced that future pressings of Find Me a Drink Home would be released by Asian Man Records.

Track listing

Credits
Credits are adapted from AllMusic.

Major credits
Cheap Girls – Composer, Primary Artist
Rick Johnson – Engineer, Keyboards, Mastering, Mixing, Producer

Music credits
Ben Graham — Drums, Vocals (Background) 
Ian Graham — Bass, Composer, Cover Photo, Guitar (Acoustic), Lyricist, Vocals   
Adam Aymor — Guitar

Misc credits
Scott Bell — Band Photo
Jeff Rosenstock — Design, Layout

References

2008 debut albums
Cheap Girls albums